An octagon is an eight-sided polygon.

Octagon may also refer to:

Buildings and locations 
Octagon Barn (disambiguation)
Octagon Building (disambiguation)
Octagon Centre, at the University of Sheffield, England
Octagon house, a unique house style
Octagon House (disambiguation)
Octagonal Schoolhouse (disambiguation)
Octagon, Alabama
Octagon, Birmingham, proposed skyscraper in Birmingham, England
Octagon, Indiana
Octagon, Virginia

Music 
Octagon (Bathory album), 1995
Octagon (String Trio of New York album), 1994
Octagon (Dilate album), 1997
Octagon, Octagon, Octagon, a 2003 EP by The Mint Chicks

People 
Octagón (born 1961), Mexican wrestler
Dr. Octagon, an alter-ego of rapper Kool Keith

Sports
Octagon (mixed martial arts), the caged enclosure used for mixed martial arts bouts
Octagon (sports agency), global sports and entertainment content marketing subsidiary
Oktagon, an Italian mixed martial arts event

Other
Octagon (wine), a wine produced by Virginia wine producer Barboursville Vineyards
Octagon (novel), a 1981 novel by Fred Saberhagen
Second Quebec Conference, codenamed OCTAGON, meeting of the allied powers during World War II
Octagonal (horse), champion Australian racehorse
Octagon (video game), a minimalist twitch-reflex video game

See also
The Octagon (disambiguation)
Octagon Theatre, Bolton, Greater Manchester, England
Octagon Theatre, Perth, a theatre at the University of Western Australia
Octagonal (disambiguation)
Oktogon (disambiguation)